Clementine de Bourges (Unknown date, Lyon? - 30 September 1561, Lyon) was a French composer of the 16th century. Accounts affirmed that Clementine mastered several instruments. However, biographical information about her life is scarce. She is mostly known through their prolific compositions of classical music. She excelled in choral works and organic music.  Mathematician and music writer Franz Gehring considered her compositions as some of the most important of her time. She died one year later after her husband died fighting against the Huguenots in 1560.

References 

16th-century women musicians
16th-century French composers
16th-century women composers
Renaissance composers
1561 deaths
Year of birth unknown